The 2015 All-Ireland Senior Ladies' Football Championship Final featured  and . Cork defeated Dublin by two points in what an RTÉ Sport report described as "largely a defensive affair" and a "tight encounter". For the Dublin manager, Gregory McGonigle, it was his fourth defeat to Cork in an All-Ireland final. The two sides were level at half-time with 0–5 each.

Route to the Final

Match info

Teams

References

!
All-Ireland Senior Ladies' Football Championship Finals
Cork county ladies' football team matches
Dublin county ladies' football team matches
All-Ireland Senior Ladies' Football Championship Final
All-Ireland Senior Ladies' Football Championship Final, 2015